Orapa United FC is a Botswana football club based in Orapa. The team currently plays in Botswana Premier League having gained promotion from Botswana First Division North League in the 2013–14 season.

The club was founded in 2012 after five football clubs in the Orapa region merged.

The club reached three consecutive Mascom Top 8 Cup finals from 2016 to 2018, the premier cup competition in Botswana. They beat Township Rollers in the 2016 final. They again defeated Township Rollers in the 2020 final.

Achievements

League
Botswana Premier League: 0
runners up  2014–15

Botswana First Division North: 1
Winners 2012–13

Cup competitions
FA Challenge Cup: 1
 2018-19.

Mascom Top 8 Cup: 2
 2016, 2020.

Performance in CAF competitions
CAF Champions League: 0 appearance

CAF Confederation Cup: 2 appearances
2017 - Preliminary Round
2019 -

Stadium
Currently the team plays at the 5000 capacity Itekeng Stadium.

References

External links
Official Website
Soccerway
Tablesleague.com

Football clubs in Botswana